Leonard Lewis "Len" Bosman (5 February 1924 – 6 February 2017) was an Australian politician.

Born in Sydney, he was educated at state schools and then at East Sydney Technical College. He owned a catering business before serving in World War II 1942–47. He was active in Apex and foreign aid organisations. In 1963, he was elected to the Australian House of Representatives as the Liberal member for St George. He held the seat until his defeat in 1969.

He died a day after his birthday in 2017 at the age of 93.

References

1924 births
2017 deaths
Liberal Party of Australia members of the Parliament of Australia
Members of the Australian House of Representatives for St George
Members of the Australian House of Representatives
20th-century Australian politicians